Iko Mirković was a Montenegrin politician and historian. He also served as the mayor of Titograd  from February 1st 1954 until April 1st 1958. Before this appointment Iko Mirkovic served as the political secretary of KPJ in Titograd from 01. Aug. 1949 to 31. Oct. 1951. 
His political career Iko Mirkovic continues as a member of Parliament Executive Council of SR Montenegro (08.04.1959 - 17.10.1960). 

Leaving the position in Titograd Iko Mirković moves to Belgrade where he serves as the Chairman of The Social and Healthcare council in the Federal Parliament (01. June 1967 - 1. June 1969). And serves as a member of Federal Parliament of SFRY (1. June 1969 - 31. May 1974)> After his appointment in the parliament  Iko Mirkovic becomes the secretary general of the Federal Partisans' Veterans Organization of Yugoslavia (Savezni odbor SUBNOR) from 01.June 1969 to 20.Oct. 1978. during presidency of Kosta Nadj. 

Following the position of the secretary general Iko Mirković was a member of the Federal advising council of SFRY (Savet Federacije SFRJ) and Federal Parliament of SFRY from which he retired on 30. Nov. 1984. Iko Mirkovic died in Belgrade 02.Aug. 2002.

Iko Mirkovic was decorated multiple times by Yugoslav and foreign governments. Decoration include Order of the Yugoslav Flag with Sash (I rank); Order of the Republic with Golden Wreath (I rank); Order of Brotherhood and Unity with Golden Wreath (I rank); Order of Labor with Red Banner (I rank); Commemorative Medal of the Partisans of 1941 (among first 100 recipients - medal No. below 100).

Bibliography 
 What National Liberation Front's Victory Means to the Youth (Šta znači pobjeda narodnog fronta za omladinu), Belgrade, 1945
 Speeches and Articles (Govori i članci), Belgrade, 1978
 Friends of My Youth (Drugovi moje mladosti), Gornji Milanovac, 1978
 Budo Tomović: Life's Road and Revolutionary Work (Budo Tomović: Životni put i revolucionarno djelo), Gornji Milanovac, 1978
 Blažo Jovanović: Life's Road and Revolutionary Work (Blažo Jovanović: Životni put i revolucionarno djelo), Gornji Milanovac, 1981
 Soldiers of NOR Yugoslavia and Their Organisation (Borci NOR Jugoslaviji i njihova organizacija), Belgrade, 1987
 Unforgettable Legends (Zapisi za nezaborav), Podgorica, 1996
 Podgorica Printing Press and Periodical "Zeta" by Jovan-Jozo Vukčević: 1930-1941 (Podgorička štamparija i list "Zeta" Jovana-Joza Vukčevića: 1930–1941), Podgorica, 1998

References
 '' Wikileaks reports on visit of Yugoslavian delegation to China 1976 ( https://www.wikileaks.org/plusd/cables/1976BELGRA04798_b.html )

Montenegrin politicians
Montenegrin historians
Mayors of Podgorica